Backspin refers to a sports ball, such as a tennis ball, that is rotating in a reverse direction from its trajectory. 

Backspin or Back spin may refer to:

 BackSpin, a classic hip-hop radio station on Sirius XM Radio
 Back Spin (novel), a novel by Harlan Coben
 Back spinning, the act of manually manipulating a vinyl record backwards during playback